The Mask of Lopez is a 1924 American silent Western film directed by Albert S. Rogell, and starring Fred Thomson, Wilfred Lucas, and Hazel Keener.

Cast

References

Bibliography
 Munden, Kenneth White. The American Film Institute Catalog of Motion Pictures Produced in the United States, Part 1. University of California Press, 1997.

External links

1924 films
1924 Western (genre) films
American black-and-white films
1920s English-language films
Films directed by Albert S. Rogell
Film Booking Offices of America films
Silent American Western (genre) films
1920s American films